John Kenneth Williams is a Pakistani politician and former army officer who has been a member of Senate of Pakistan, since March 2015.

Political career

He was elected to the Senate of Pakistan as a candidate of  Pakistan Tehreek-e-Insaf on reserved seat for minorities in 2015 Pakistani Senate election.

References

Living people
Year of birth missing (living people)
Pakistani senators (14th Parliament)
Pakistan Tehreek-e-Insaf politicians
Pakistan Army officers